Brittni Donaldson (born April 7, 1993 in Sioux City, Iowa) is an Assistant Coach / Director of Coaching Analytics for the Detroit Pistons of the NBA. She previously served as an Assistant Coach for the Toronto Raptors from 2019-2021.

Donaldson played basketball for the Northern Iowa Panthers from 2011-2015 and graduated with a degree in Statistics and Actuarial Sciences. She still holds the school record for 3pt shots made in a single game (8). After graduation, she became a SportVU Data Analyst at STATS LLC, and then in 2017 was hired as a Data Analyst for the Toronto Raptors. She was promoted in 2019 by team president Masai Ujiri to be the 10th active female assistant coach in the NBA. At the time, she was the youngest active Assistant Coach in the NBA at the age of 26.

During the shortened 2021 NBA G-League Bubble season, Donaldson joined the Raptors 905 as a member of their coaching staff under head coach Patrick Mutombo.

In May 2022, Donaldson joined the Hamilton Honey Badgers of the CEBL as the Director of Coaching Development / Assistant Coach. After helping the Honey Badgers win their first CEBL Championship, she was hired by the Detroit Pistons under head coach Dwane Casey in September 2022.

University of Northern Iowa statistics

Source

Personal life
Donaldson is the daughter of Jeff and Carmen Donaldson. Jeff is a former basketball star at Briar Cliff College and a member of the Iowa High School Athletic Association Basketball Hall of Fame. Carmen played softball and volleyball.  Both parents grew up in Iowa.

References

1993 births
Living people
American expatriate basketball people in Canada
American women's basketball players
Basketball players from Iowa
Northern Iowa Panthers women's basketball players
North High School (Sioux City, Iowa) alumni
People from Sioux City, Iowa
Raptors 905 coaches
Toronto Raptors assistant coaches
Detroit Pistons assistant coaches